Karolin Lampert (born 20 February 1995) is a German professional golfer and member of the Ladies European Tour. She was part of the winning team Johanna Gustavsson at the 2022 Aramco Team Series – New York.

Amateur career
Lampert was a member of the National Team from 2008. With the team, she came second in the 2012 Espirito Santo Trophy, the world amateur team golf championship for women. Individually, she was German Girls Champion in 2011 and 2012 and won the 2012 Spanish International Ladies Amateur Championship. She represented Europe at the Junior Solheim Cup in 2013.

Professional career
Lampert turned professional in 2013. Playing on the LET Access Series she missed ten cuts in a row, then turned around her form to win the 2015 Azores Ladies Open in Portugal. She finished in 31st place on the LETAS Order of Merit and earned her Ladies European Tour card for the 2016 season by finishing in 3rd place at the Lalla Aicha Final Qualifying School in Morocco.

On the 2018 Ladies European Tour, she was runner up at the South African Women's Open, two strokes behind Ashleigh Buhai, and lost a playoff to Astrid Vayson de Pradenne at the Jabra Ladies Open, but still earned qualification for the 2018 Evian Championship. She finished 8th in the 2018 LET rankings and 10th on the 2019 LET rankings.

In 2022, she won the team event at the Aramco Team Series – New York together with Johanna Gustavsson and Jessica Karlsson, one stroke ahead of a team captained by Nelly Korda.

Personal
Lampert's brother, Moritz, has played on the European Tour.

Amateur wins
2011 German Girls Open, German Girls Under 16
2012 Spanish Ladies Amateur - Copa S.M. La Reina, German Girls Open, German National Amateur

Source:

Professional wins (1)

LET Access Series wins (1)

Team appearances
Amateur
European Girls' Team Championship  (representing Germany): 2011, 2012
Junior Vagliano Trophy (representing the Continent of Europe): 2011 (winners)
Espirito Santo Trophy (representing Germany): 2012
Vagliano Trophy (representing the Continent of Europe): 2013 (winners)
European Ladies' Team Championship (representing Germany): 2013
Junior Solheim Cup (representing Europe): 2013

Source:

References

External links

German female golfers
Ladies European Tour golfers
People from Schwetzingen
Sportspeople from Karlsruhe (region)
1995 births
Living people
21st-century German women